is the 18th single by Japanese music trio Candies. Written by Yoko Aki and Yūsuke Hoguchi, the single was released on February 25, 1978. The song contains certain lyrics of their previous singles "Haru Ichiban", "Un, Deux, Trois", and "Wana".

The song hit No. 1 on Oricon's singles chart and sold over 829,000 copies, becoming their only No. 1 single.

Track listing 
All lyrics are written by Yoko Aki; all music is composed and arranged by Yūsuke Hoguchi.

Chart positions

References

External links 
 

1978 singles
1978 songs
Japanese-language songs
Candies (group) songs
Oricon Weekly number-one singles
Sony Music Entertainment Japan singles
Songs with lyrics by Yoko Aki